ADCI is a pharmaceutical substance that may be used to treat epilepsy and other disorders.

ADCI is also an acronym that may refer to:
 Acting or Assistant Director of Central Intelligence
 Acting Detective Chief Inspector
 Antibody-Dependent Cellular Inhibition
 Association of Diving Contractors International 
 Automatic Display Call Indicator